Esther Bernabela is a doctor and politician from Bonaire. She is an independent member of the Island Council of Bonaire. In the 2017 election, Bernabela joined a coalition of elected members of the Bonaire Patriotic Union (UPB) and the Bonaire Democratic Party. This replaced the previous 2016 coalition that she was a member of. A former leader of the UPB, she declared herself an independent candidate in March 2016, and withdrew her support from the party in April. However by 2021 she had re-joined the party. 

In 2020 she spoke out against the rise in prostitution in Bonaire. She has previously worked for the International University School of Medicine.

References 

Living people
Year of birth missing (living people)
Members of the Island Council of Bonaire
Bonaire politicians
Bonaire women in politics
Bonaire physicians
Bonaire Patriotic Union politicians
Women in medicine